DTPMP or diethylenetriamine penta(methylene phosphonic acid) is a phosphonic acid. It has chelating and anti corrosion properties.

Properties
DTPMP is normally delivered as salts, because the acid form has very limited solubility in water and tends to crystallize in concentrated aqueous solutions. It is a nitrogenous organic polyphosphonic acid. It shows very good inhibition of the precipitation of barium sulfate (BaSO4). At high alkali and high temperature (above 210 °C) environments DTPMPA has better scale and corrosion inhibition effect than other phosphonates.

Applications
 Detergents and cleaning agents
 Water treatment
 Scaling inhibitor
 Chelating agent
 Deflocculation agent / settling retarder 
 Anti corrosion agent

Phosphonic acids
Chelating agents